The 1927–28 Ohio Bobcats men's basketball team represented Ohio University. Butch Grover was the head coach for Ohio. The Bobcats played their home games at the Men's Gymnasium.  They finished 10–10 and 4–6 in the Buckeye Athletic Association.

Schedule

|-
!colspan=9 style=| Regular Season

Source:

References

Ohio Bobcats men's basketball seasons
Ohio
Ohio Bobcats
Ohio Bobcats